Auguste Ludwig (1834-1901) was a German genre painter.

Biography
Ludwig was born on 26 February 1834 in Gräfenthal. Throughout her career she live in Dresden, Weimar, Berlin, and Düsseldorf. She exhibited her work at the Woman's Building at the 1893 World's Columbian Exposition in Chicago, Illinois.

Ludwig died in 1901.

References

External links
  
 images of Ludwig's work on ArtNet

1834 births
1901 deaths
German women painters
19th-century German women artists
19th-century German painters